Out of the Depths (German: De Profundis) is a 1919 German silent drama film directed by Georg Jacoby and starring Ellen Richter, Olga Engl and Hugo Flink. Its Latin title refers to Psalm 130. It portrays the story of a young female anarchist who assassinates a Russian Grand Duke.

It was shot at the Tempelhof Studios in Berlin. The film's sets were designed by the art director Jack Winter.

Cast
In alphabetical order
Frau Böttcher
Olga Engl
Hugo Flink as Alexej 
Martin Hartwig
Poldi Müller
Emil Rameau as Geheimpolizei-Chef 
Ellen Richter as Sonja 
Heinrich Schroth as Amerikaner 
Hans Schweikart as Student Sergej 
Magnus Stifter as Grossfürst Ivanovitz

References

External links

Films of the Weimar Republic
German silent feature films
Films directed by Georg Jacoby
German drama films
1919 drama films
UFA GmbH films
Films shot at Tempelhof Studios
Films set in Russia
Films based on American novels
German black-and-white films
Silent drama films
1910s German films